Jeffrey Cohen is an American sports executive who served as general manager of the Kansas City Kings from 1981 to 1982 and athletic director at Brandeis University from 1986 to 2004. Prior to joining the Kings, Cohen spent 16 years with the Boston Celtics, rising to the position of assistant general manager.

Early life
Cohen is the son of Sam Cohen, a sports editor for The Boston Record, Boston Record American, and Boston Herald American. The elder Cohen was close friends with Boston Celtics head coach and general manager Red Auerbach.

NBA
Cohen graduated from Brandeis University in 1964, where he majored in history. After doing graduate work at the University of California and working for the Baltimore News-American, he joined the Celtics as a part-time assistant to publicist Howie McHugh. In 1969 he became the club's assistant general manager. In 1979 he interviewed to become general manager of the Kansas City Kings, but was passed over in favor of John Begzos. The position opened up again a year later and on January 23, 1981, the Kings announced Cohen as their new GM. He joined the team on March 1, 1981. His stint in Kansas City lasted just over a year as on April 30, 1982, the Kings announced that former general manager Joe Axelson would be returning to the club. In his only season as GM, the Kings failed to follow up a surprise conference finals run by finishing 30-52 and missing the playoffs.

Brandeis
In September 1982, Cohen was named executive vice president of the Boston Breakers of the newly-formed United States Football League. The team lasted only one season in Boston before leaving for New Orleans. Cohen did not move with the team, instead joining the development office at Brandeis. In 1986 he became the school's athletic director. During his tenure as AD, Brandeis joined the University Athletic Association, constructed a $25 million sports complex which included the Red Auerbach Arena, launched an athletic hall of fame, hosted the 1998 NCAA Division III Men's and Women's Indoor Track and Field Championships and 1999 NCAA Fencing Championships, and hired former Celtics head coach Chris Ford to coach its men's basketball team. In 1999 he was named the Jostens-Eastern College Athletic Conference Male Administrator of the Year. In January 2004, Cohen abruptly resigned from Brandeis, telling The Boston Globe that he was leaving because "lame duck is not a good thing to be. I'd be in the way. I love Brandeis, and I don't want to be in the way". Later that year he moved to Colorado Springs, Colorado to become the director of athletic programs for the United States Fencing Association.

References

Boston Celtics executives
Brandeis University alumni
Brandeis Judges athletic directors
Kansas City Kings executives
National Basketball Association executives
United States Football League executives